Chie Chie Yard , also known as  is a Japanese-American retired ice hockey player, currently serving as the National Hockey League (NHL) Vice President of Events. She represented  in the women's tournament at the 1998 Winter Olympics.

Sakuma was introduced to hockey by her older brother, Teppei, and began playing as a child in her hometown of Houston, Texas. When she was 10, Sakuma's father, Hajime, coached her on a boys' peewee team. Connections Hajime had forged with the ice hockey community in Japan made it possible for the team to travel from Houston to Hokkaido for a tournament.

Sakuma's college ice hockey career was played with the Brown Bears women's ice hockey program under head coach Digit Murphy during 1990 to 1994.

Several months after graduating from Brown University with a degree in anthropology and management, she moved to Japan. While living in Japan, Sakuma worked as a translator for the owner of a major trucking company, who was also president of the Hokkaido hockey association. She played ice hockey with the company-sponsored Iwakura Peregrine of the Women's Japan Ice Hockey League (WJIHL) and with the fledling Japanese national team. Born and raised in the United States, Sakuma qualified to play for Japan because of her ancestry.

Following the 1998 Olympics, Sakuma joined the NHL as an intern. As of 2021, she is NHL Vice President of Events, with a portfolio that includes such signature events as Kraft Hockeyville, the NHL Winter Classic, the NHL All-Star Game, NHL Awards, outdoor hockey games, and numerous other projects.

Awards
In 2018, Sakuma was selected as a part of Sports Business Journal's eighth annual class of Game Changers.

References

External links
 

1972 births
Living people
Ice hockey people from Texas
Sportspeople from Houston
Japanese women's ice hockey defencemen
Brown Bears women's ice hockey players
Olympic ice hockey players of Japan
Ice hockey players at the 1998 Winter Olympics